The Merchants & Farmers Bank is a historic bank building at Waterman and Main Streets in Dumas, Arkansas. The Classical Revival brick building was built in 1913 to a design by Charles L. Thompson. It is a single story, with the brick laid in Flemish bond. The main entrance is flanked by marble Ionic columns.

The building was listed on the National Register of Historic Places in 1982.

See also
National Register of Historic Places listings in Desha County, Arkansas

References

Bank buildings on the National Register of Historic Places in Arkansas
Neoclassical architecture in Arkansas
Commercial buildings completed in 1913
Buildings and structures in Desha County, Arkansas
1913 establishments in Arkansas
National Register of Historic Places in Desha County, Arkansas